Temple of Low Men is the second studio album by New Zealand-Australian rock band Crowded House, released by Capitol Records on 5 July 1988. The three band members, Neil Finn, Nick Seymour and Paul Hester, recorded the album in Melbourne and Los Angeles with Mitchell Froom as producer. Finn had written all ten tracks during the two years since their self-titled debut. Temple of Low Men peaked at number one in Australia, number two in New Zealand, number ten in Canada and number 40 on the US Billboard 200.

At the ARIA Music Awards of 1989 the group won four categories: Album of the Year and Best Group for Temple of Low Men; Best Cover Art for Seymour's work; and Song of the Year for "Better Be Home Soon".

Background 

Crowded House and Neil Finn, as their main songwriter, were under pressure to create a second album to match their self-titled debut from June 1986; the band joked that one potential title for the new release was Mediocre Follow-Up. Eventually titled Temple of Low Men, their second album was released in July 1988 with strong promotion by Capitol Records.

Crowded House undertook a short tour of Australia and Canada to promote the album, with Eddie Rayner (former Split Enz bandmate of Hester and Finn) as a touring member on keyboards. Multi-instrumentalist Mark Hart (ex-Supertramp) replaced Rayner in January 1989. After the tour, Finn fired Seymour from the band. Music journalist Ed Nimmervoll claimed that Seymour's temporary departure was because Finn blamed him for causing his writer's block, however Finn cited "artistic differences" as the reason. Seymour said that after a month he contacted Finn and they agreed that he would return to the band.

Composition and recording 
Neil Finn wrote all ten tracks for Temple of Low Men during the two years since their first album. It was produced by Mitchell Froom, recorded by Tchad Blake and mixed by Bob Clearmountain. The cover was created by Seymour. The lyric 'Tongue in the Mail' from the track "Love This Life" gave its name to the band's official mailing list.

Reception 

AllMusic praised Temple of Low Men, but noted a change of tone from the previous album, saying, "The material on Temple of Low Men demonstrates great leaps in quality over its predecessor, it is a darkly difficult album ... Finn digs into the depths of his emotional psyche with obsessive detail, crafting a set of intense, personal songs ... Through all of this introspective soul-searching, Finn reveals most of all his true mastery of melody. Robert Christgau of The Village Voice panned the album as being buried in sanctimonious self-pity, and commented that "Finn has neglected the only thing he has to offer the world: perky hooks."

In October 2010, Temple of Low Men was listed at number 71 in the book, 100 Best Australian Albums, with the band's next album, Woodface at No. 3.

Track listing

Personnel

Crowded House 
 Neil Finn – lead vocals, guitar
 Nick Seymour – bass, backing vocals
 Paul Hester – drums, backing vocals

Additional musicians 
 Tim Finn – backing vocals
 Mitchell Froom – keyboards
 Richard Thompson – guitar solo "Sister Madly"
 Alex Acuña – percussion
 Heart Attack Horns – horns

Charts

Weekly charts

Year-end charts

Certifications

References

External links 
 Official Crowded House website

1988 albums
ARIA Award-winning albums
Crowded House albums
Albums produced by Mitchell Froom
Albums recorded at Sunset Sound Recorders
Jangle pop albums